The women's individual pursuit at the 2018 Commonwealth Games was part of the cycling programme, which took place on 6 April 2018.

Records
Prior to this competition, the existing world and Games records were as follows:

Schedule
The schedule is as follows:

All times are Australian Eastern Standard Time (UTC+10)

Results

Qualifying
The two fastest riders advance to the gold medal final. The next two fastest riders advance to the bronze medal final.

Finals
The final classification is determined in the medal finals.

References

Women's individual pursuit
Cycling at the Commonwealth Games – Women's individual pursuit
Comm